The Wyoming Soccer Association is the governing body of soccer in the state of Wyoming.

References

External links
 Wyoming Soccer Association official site

State Soccer Associations
Soccer in Wyoming
1978 establishments in Wyoming
Organizations based in Wyoming
Sports organizations established in 1978
Organizations based in Casper, Wyoming